Sima Pandurović (14 April 1883 – 27 August 1960) was a Serbian poet, part of the Symbolist movement in European poetry at the time. He died in Belgrade on 27 August 1960.

Works

Selected works
, 1908
, drama, 1910
, 1912
, 1918
, 1920
, 1921
, 1927
, 1931
, V volumes, 1935—1937
, 1955
, 1959

Translations
Le roi s'amuse, 1904
Athalie, 1913
Romanticne Duse, 1919
Tartuffe
Hamlet
Richard III
Henry IV
Macbeth

Sources
 Jovan Skerlić,  / History of Modern Serbian Literature (Belgrade, 1921), pp. 465–466.

External links
Article on Serbian Poetry
Translated works by Sima Pandurović

1883 births
1960 deaths
Writers from Belgrade
Serbian male poets
20th-century Serbian poets
20th-century male writers